Carl Seelig (born May 11, 1894, Zurich; died February 15, 1962, Zurich) was a German-Swiss writer and patron. He was best known as a friend, promoter and guardian of Robert Walser and the first biographer of Albert Einstein.

Life
The son of a wealthy family, was literarily active at early age. Through his work as editor of several anthologies, and a silent partner in the Viennese publisher EPTal & Co, he entered into contact with many German writers, and proved to be especially sensitive.

His production was enormously rich and varied: from poetry and folk song collections to collaborator to Albert Einstein's Mein Weltbild. An international libraries overview counted 163 published works, in 294 publications and 13 languages. Seelig's recorded correspondents were, among others, Max Brod, Hans Henny Jahnn, Alfred Polgar and Joseph Roth. He also maintained close contacts with Swiss authors, most notably Robert Walser, whom he accompanied on his walks, giving rise to the biographical work, Wanderungen mit Robert Walser, which was translated for the first time into the English, Walks with Walser, by Anne Posten in 2017.

The Swiss Literary Archives store, as a long-term loan, approximately 6,000 manuscript pieces by Seelig.

Bibliography

German 

 Der Tag bricht an. Neue Gedichte von Waldemar Bonsels, Martin Buber, Hermann Hesse, Stefan Zweig (editor, 1921)
 Das neue Wunderhorn (editor, 1924)
 Die Jahreszeyten im Spiegel schweizerischer Volkssprüche (editor, 1925)
 Robert Walser: Vom Glück des Unglücks und der Armut. Die schönsten besinnlichen Stellen aus Walsers Büchern – stille Weisheit eines wahren Poeten (editor, 1944)
 Novalis: Gesammelte Werke (editor, 1945/1946)
 Sterne: Anekdotische Kurzgeschichten aus sechs Jahrhunderten (editor, 1950)
 Robert Walser: Jakob von Gunten. (editor, 1950).
 Albert Einstein und die Schweiz (1952)
 Robert Walser: Dichtungen in Prosa (1953–1961)
 Albert Einstein (1954)
Helle Zeit — Dunkle Zeit: In memoriam Albert Einstein (editor, 1956)
 Wanderungen mit Robert Walser (1957)
 Albert Einstein: Mein Weltbild (first published 1934 by Rudolf Kayser, extended edition published by Seelig in 1954)
 Originelle Gestalten der Familie Schoop. In: Thurgauer Jahrbuch. 33. Jahrgang, pages 95–110 (1958)
Albert Einstein Leben Und Werk Eines Genies Unserer Zeit (1960

English Translations 

 Albert Einstein: A Documentary Biography (1956)
 Ideas and Opinions by Albert Einstein (editor, translation first published 1954)
 The World as I See It (editor, translation first published 2015)
 Walks with Walser (2017)

Writers from Zürich
1962 deaths
Swiss writers in German
20th-century Swiss writers
1894 births
Swiss essayists
20th-century essayists